Zany Afternoons is a book containing a collection of some of illustrator Bruce McCall's best comic paintings to 1982. It was published by Knopf in that year and featured works that originally appeared mainly in National Lampoon. At 126 pages, the book includes written and illustrated material. Some of the pieces included in Zany Afternoons included:

 Soviet Mechnod-Foto Hello! - a parody of Soviet propaganda newspapers
 Wing Dining
 Pyramid Climber
 Rich People
 Bulgemobiles
 Tank Polo
 Zeppelin Shoots - "they fell so much more gracefully than grouse"
 RMS Tyrannic, The Biggest Thing In All The World
 Nazi Regalia for Gracious Living
 Huge Machines
 Major Howdy Bixby's Album of Forgotten War Birds - a parody of old-fashioned military planes, first published in Playboy magazine 1970
 New York, Once Upon a Time
 1936 Cairo World's Fair
 That Fabulous Battle of Britain!
 My Own Stamp Album 
 Swillmart Supplement & Other Glimpses of the Golden Age of Play
 The Adventures of the Hotel Throckmorton

Notes

Books about visual art
1982 books